Football Club Swift Hesperange is a football club, based in Hesperange, in southern Luxembourg.

History
1916: Club founded as FC Swift Hesperange
1940: Club renamed as FV Rot-Weiß Hesperingen during the German occupation
1944: Original name FC Swift Hesperange restored
1985: First season in National Division
1990: Winners of Luxembourg Cup
1990: First participation in European competition (season 1990–91)

In the 2005–2006 season, Hesperange finished ninth in the National Division.  The following year, they improved this position to fifth, level on points with fourth-placed Racing FC and sixth-placed CS Grevenmacher. During the 2013–2014 season, Hesperange finished 13th and has thus been relegated to the Éierepromotioun. The gained promotion back to the top division in the 2019–2020 season where they finished third in their first season back and qualified for play in Europe.

Honours

Luxembourg Cup
Winners (1): 1989–90

European competition

Overall, Swift's record in European competition reads:

Notes
 QR: Qualifying round
 1R: First round

Current squad

Managers
 Théo Scholten (1 July 1999 – 30 June 2001)
 Carlo Weis (2004–05)
 Luc Muller (1 July 2004 – 30 June 2008)
 Théo Scholten (1 July 2008 – 29 March 2010)
 Angelo Fiorucci (29 March 2010 – 14 March 2011)
 Nedžib Selimović (14 March 2011 – 8 March 2012)
 Dany Theis (9 March 2012 – 30 June 2012)
 Serge Wolf (1 July 2012–)
 Serge Missler (1 July 2014–)

External links
 

Football clubs in Luxembourg
FC Swift Hesperange
Association football clubs established in 1916
FC Swift Hesperange